Araslanovo (Arıślan) is a rural locality (a village) in Araslanovsky Selsoviet, Meleuzovsky District, Bashkortostan, Russia. The population was 159 as of 2010. There are 3 streets.

Geography 
Araslanovo is located 15 km northeast of Meleuz (the district's administrative centre) by road. Smakovo is the nearest rural locality.

References 

Rural localities in Meleuzovsky District